David Charles "Dino" Vanole (February 6, 1963 – January 15, 2007) was an American soccer goalkeeper and coach.  He spent his professional career in the Western Soccer Alliance and its successor league, the American Professional Soccer League.  He also earned 14 caps with the U.S. national team including appearances at the 1988 Summer Olympics and was a squad member at the 1990 FIFA World Cup.

Youth and college
He attended Aviation High School in Redondo Beach, California, where he was a three-sport letterman and a four-time All-Ocean League goalkeeper.  Vanole played for UCLA from 1981 to 1985. As a junior, he backstopped UCLA to the NCAA Men's Soccer Championship. In that game, UCLA defeated American University in eight overtimes.

Professional
After graduating from UCLA, Vanole played for the Los Angeles Heat from 1986 to 1990.  In 1988, he also played for the San Jose Earthquakes.  He played for the Wichita Wings during the 1987–1988 Major Indoor Soccer League season.  In 1991, he finished his professional career with the San Francisco Bay Blackhawks which won the American Professional Soccer League championship that season.

National team
Vanole earned his first cap with the national team in a February 5, 1986 0–0 tie with Canada. He would go on to appear a total of 18 times for the U.S. national team; however, only 14 are counted as full internationals. Vanole played 4 games with the U.S. Olympic team, including the 1988 Summer Olympics. While the U.S. national team at the time doubled as the U.S. Olympic in 1988, FIFA does not count Olympic matches as full internationals. Vanole was also on the U.S. team at the 1987 Pan American Games. Vanole started 4 of the 5 games played by the national team in 1986 and 1987. However, he shared duties with a string of other goalkeepers in 1988. On April 30, 1989, he made one of the biggest saves of his career: preserving a 1–0 U.S. victory against Costa Rica in a critical World Cup qualifier by saving a penalty kick in injury time. He had regained the position of the top U.S. goalkeeper, but was unable to control his weight and later that year he lost his starting position to Tony Meola. The clinching moment came in a U.S. game against Italian club A. S. Roma.  While the U.S. won 4–3, Vanole's poor performance convinced Gansler to give the starting job to Meola.

In January, 1990, Vanole, under contract to the United States Soccer Federation, sat out the national team's training camp with a contract dispute. However, he was selected as the backup goalkeeper to Tony Meola at the 1990 FIFA World Cup. Here he gained worldwide attention, as he sat the bench during the matches and wore a cap with a Stars & Stripes-flag. Ultimately, however, he was ordered by coach Bob Gansler to stop wearing it, as Gansler felt the look was unprofessional and not in keeping with the image the U.S. team wished to present. Since Vanole did not play in this tournament, his last official cap came in 1989.

Vanole played on the Pro Beach Soccer tour for four years and was twice voted the best goalkeeper on the beach. He also played at the 1989 FIFA Futsal World Cup finals.

Coaching career
Vanole spent six years as an assistant coach for goalkeepers for both the men and women's teams at UCLA; U.S. Women's Olympic and National Teams; and the Men's U-20 team. He also served as the goalkeeper coach for D.C. United of Major League Soccer (MLS) as well as the Washington Freedom of the Women's United Soccer Association (WUSA).

On May 25, 2000, Vanole became the goalkeeper coach for the United States women's national soccer team.

He was the goalkeeper coach for the New England Revolution of MLS from 2004 to 2006.

Death
Vanole, who lived in New York City, died on January 15, 2007, in Salt Lake City of a heart attack during a family skiing vacation. He is survived by his wife, Kerry Tatlock, the NBA's senior director of global marketing partnerships, as well as by his mother, siblings, and large extended family.

References

External links
 David Vanole and the esophagus that saved U.S. soccer (ESPN) 
 MISL stats

1963 births
2007 deaths
American soccer coaches
American soccer players
American Professional Soccer League players
Association football goalkeepers
Footballers at the 1988 Summer Olympics
Los Angeles Heat players
Major Indoor Soccer League (1978–1992) players
Olympic soccer players of the United States
Pan American Games competitors for the United States
Footballers at the 1987 Pan American Games
Soccer players from New York City
People from Greater Los Angeles
San Francisco Bay Blackhawks players
San Jose Earthquakes (1974–1988) players
Soccer players from California
UCLA Bruins men's soccer players
United States men's international soccer players
Western Soccer Alliance players
Wichita Wings (MISL) players
1990 FIFA World Cup players
Sportspeople from Redondo Beach, California
UCLA Bruins women's soccer coaches
D.C. United non-playing staff
New England Revolution non-playing staff